Harkimo is Finnish surname.  Notable people with the surname include:

 Harry Harkimo (born 1953), Finnish businessman
 Leena Harkimo (born 1963), Finnish politician and business executive
 Osmo Harkimo (1923–2007), Finnish cinematographer

References

Finnish-language surnames